Paul A. Worlock (September 21, 1931 – April 9, 2017) was an American politician who served in the New York State Assembly from Oneida's 1st district from 1961 to 1965.

He died on April 9, 2017, in Rome, New York at age 85.

References

1931 births
2017 deaths
Democratic Party members of the New York State Assembly